Civil Security Forces may refer to:

 Sri Lanka Civil Security Force
 Ministry of State Security (North Korea) of North Korea

See also
 Civil defense
 Civil Guard (disambiguation)